Zaleeha Fathoum Issadeen also simply known as Fathoum Issadeen (born 20 January 1998) is a Sri Lankan female squash player. She reached her highest career singles ranking of 208 in April 2016.  She won the Nationals for the Year 2019 and was Crowned Women’s Squash National Champion of Sri Lanka.

She qualified to represent Sri Lanka at the 2018 Asian Games and competed in the women's squash singles event. She represented Sri Lanka in many International Tours. She captained for Sri Lanka squash in the year 2019. She won the bronze medal in the team event at the South Asian Games in 2016 Guwahati India and also at the South Asian Games in 2019 Nepal.

References 

1998 births
Living people
Sri Lankan female squash players
Squash players at the 2018 Asian Games
Asian Games competitors for Sri Lanka
Sportspeople from Colombo
South Asian Games medalists in squash
South Asian Games bronze medalists for Sri Lanka